Jebel Barkal or Gebel Barkal is a mesa or large rock outcrop located 400 km north of Khartoum, next to Karima in Northern State in Sudan, on the Nile River, in the region that is sometimes called Nubia. The jebel is 104 m tall, has a flat top, and came to have religious significance for both ancient Kush and ancient Egyptian occupiers. In 2003, the mountain, together with the extensive archaeological site at its base (ancient Napata), were named as the center of a World Heritage Site by UNESCO. The Jebel Barkal area houses the Jebel Barkal Museum.

History
The earliest occupation of Jebel Barkal was that of the Kerma culture that was also known as Kush, but this occupation is so far known only from scattered potsherds.

Around 1450 BCE, the Egyptian Pharaoh Thutmose III conquered Barkal and built a fortified settlement (Egyptian menenu) there as the southern limit of the Egyptian empire. The city and region around it came to be called Napata, and the Egyptian occupation of Jebel Barkal extended through most of the New Kingdom of Egypt. The Egyptians built a complex of temples at the site, centered on a temple to Amun of Napata—a local, ram-headed form of the main god of the Egyptian capital city of Thebes, Egypt. In the last years of the New Kingdom and after its collapse in 1169 BC, there was little construction at Jebel Barkal. Apart from the temples, no trace of this Egyptian settlement has yet been found at the site.

Jebel Barkal was the capital city of the Kingdom of Kush as it returned to power in the years after 800 BCE as the Dynasty of Napata. The Kushite kings who conquered and ruled over Egypt as the 25th Dynasty, including Kashta, Piankhy (or Piye), and Taharqa, all built, renovated, and expanded monumental structures at the site.

After the Kushites were driven out by the Assyrian conquest of Egypt in the mid-7th century BC, they continued to rule Kush with Jebel Barkal and the city of Meroë as the most important urban centers of Kush. Jebel Barkal's palaces and temples continued to be renovated from the 7th-early 3rd centuries BC. Most of the royal pyramid burials of the kings and queens of Kush during this time were built at the site of Nuri, 9 km to the northeast of Jebel Barkal.

In 270 BCE, the location of Kushite royal burials was moved to Meroë, inaugurating the Meroitic period of the Kingdom of Kush. Jebel Barkal continued to be an important city of Kush during the Meroitic period. A sequence of palaces were built, most notably by King Natakamani, new temples were built and older temples were renovated. During the 1st century BC - 1st century AD, eight royal pyramid burials were built at Jebel Barkal (rather than at Meroë), for reasons that are not clear, but perhaps reflecting the prominence of one or more families from the city.

After the collapse of Kush during the 4th century AD, Jebel Barkal continued to be occupied in the medieval (Christian) period of Nubia, as attested by architectural remains, burials, and burial inscriptions.

Temples

The ruins around Jebel Barkal include at least 13 temples that were built, renovated, and expanded over a period of over 1,500 years. The temples were described for the first time by a series of European explorers beginning in the 1820s. Their drawings and descriptions, particularly those of Frédéric Cailliaud (1821), Louis Maurice Adolphe Linant de Bellefonds (1821), and Karl Richard Lepsius (1844), record significant architectural details that have since disappeared. In 1862 five inscriptions from the Third Intermediate Period were recovered by an Egyptian officer and transported to the Cairo Museum, but not until 1916 were scientific archeological excavations performed by a joint expedition of Harvard University and the Museum of Fine Arts of Boston under the direction of George Reisner. From the 1970s, explorations continued by a team from the University of Rome La Sapienza, under the direction of Sergio Donadoni, that was joined by another team from the Boston Museum, in the 1980s, under the direction of Timothy Kendall.

Temple of Amun and Temple of Mut

The larger temples, such as the Temple of Amun, are even today considered sacred to the local population. The carved wall painted chambers of the Temple of Mut are well preserved.

Temple B700 at Jebel Barkal
Temple B700, built by Atlanersa and decorated by Senkamanisken, is now largely destroyed. It received the sacred bark of Amun from the nearby B500 on certain cultic occasions, and may have served during the coronation of the kings of the early Napatan period, in the mid 7th century BC. The Temple was decorated by Senkamanisken, where he is shown clubbing enemies.

The hieroglyphic inscription on the Temple described the role of the god Amun in selecting Sekamanisken as king:

Pyramids 

Jebel Barkal served as a royal cemetery during the Meroitic Kingdom. The earliest burials date back to the 3rd century BC.

Bar. 1 King from the middle of the 1st century BCE
Bar. 2 King Teriqas (c. 29–25 BCE)
Bar. 4 Queen Amanirenas ? (1st century BCE)
Bar. 6 Queen Nawidemak (1st century BCE)
Bar. 7 King Sabrakamani? (3rd century BCE)
Bar. 9 King or Queen of the early 2nd century CE
Bar. 11 King Aktisanes (3rd century BCE)
Bar. 14 King Aryamani (3rd century BCE)
Bar. 15 King Kash[...]merj Imen (3rd century BCE)

History of Excavation of the Site 
Napata’s urban remains have not yet been significantly excavated, but rubble heaps indicate that the area was probably home to major settlement in antiquity. There are no traces of a pre-Egyptian settlement, though this may change as more is uncovered at the site. The earliest buildings found at Napata date from the middle of the eighteenth Dynasty. The first archaeologist to work at the site was George A. Reisner who worked there from 1916-1920 and excavated a number of buildings. His first excavation at Napata was a large Meroitic structure (Named “B 100”) that dated to the first century CE. At first, Reisner assumed this to be an “administrative building”, though it is now known to have been a palace.

Artifacts in Museums

See also 
 List of World Heritage Sites in Africa
 Nubian pyramids
 Pyramids at El-Kurru
 Pyramids of Jebel Barkal
 Pyramids of Meroë
 Pyramids of Nuri
 Sedeinga pyramids

References

Sources

External links 

 Website of the National Corporation for Antiquities and Museums Archaeological Mission at Jebel Barkal
 LearningSites.com - Gebel Barkal
 UNESCO World Heritage Centre - Gebel Barkal and the Sites of the Napatan Region 
 Gebel Barkal and the Sites of the Napatan Region UNESCO collection on Google Arts and Culture
 The Victory Stela of Piye

Nubia
Barkal
Archaeological sites in Sudan
History of Nubia
World Heritage Sites in Sudan
Northern (state)
Pyramids in Sudan